"Say It with Pride" was a single released by the Scotland national football team in 1990.  It reached number 45 in the UK Singles Chart.

References

1990 singles
Football songs and chants
Scotland national football team songs
1990 songs
Scotland at the 1990 FIFA World Cup
Song articles with missing songwriters